Dongola is a district of Northern state, Sudan. Its population was 150,161 in 2008.

References

Districts of Sudan